Moods is the eighth solo studio album by American country music singer, Barbara Mandrell, released in September 1978.

Moods became Mandrell's most successful album during her career up to this point. The album spawned two singles, both of which became #1 country hits, "Sleeping Single in a Double Bed" and a remake of the popular Luther Ingram R&B hit, "(If Loving You Is Wrong) I Don't Want to Be Right". Both singles also charted on the Pop and Adult Contemporary charts. "If Loving You Is Wrong" became Mandrell's only Top 40 Pop hit, peaking at #31 on the Billboard Hot 100 chart. The popularity of these singles made "Moods" a success, peaking at #8 on the Top Country Albums chart – her highest charting album at that time. The album was also Mandrell's first to chart on the Billboard 200, peaking at #132.

Moods consisted of 10 tracks, ranging from sultry ballads to bouncy pop tunes. The album foreshadowed the success Mandrell would have well into the 1980s, when she would achieve more best-selling albums and reach the pinnacle of her career. She would become one of the few women to win "Entertainer of the Year" (and the first person to ever win it twice) from the Country Music Association and would also win American Music Awards and two Grammy awards.

Track listing
"(If Loving You Is Wrong) I Don't Want to Be Right" (Homer Banks, Carl Hampton, Raymond Jackson) 3:04
"Sleeping Single In a Double Bed" (Kye Fleming, Dennis Morgan) 2:19
"No Walls, No Ceilings, No Floors" (Archie Jordan, Hal David) 2:49
"It's a Cryin' Shame" (Fleming, Morgan) 3:04
"Early Fall" (John Schweers) 3:31
"Pity Party" (Fleming, Morgan) 2:29
"I Feel the Hurt Comin' On" (Fleming, Morgan) 2:52
"Just One More of Your Goodbyes" (Fleming, Morgan) 3:15
"I Believe You" (Dick Addrisi, Don Addrisi) 3:16
"Don't Bother to Knock" (Fleming, Morgan) 2:39

Personnel
Compiled from liner notes.

Musicians
 Hayward Bishop – drums
 David Briggs – piano
 Clyde Brooks – Pollard Syndrum
 Pete Bordonali – guitar
 James Burton – guitar
 Jimmy Capps – guitar
 Bruce Dees Singers – background vocals
 Janie Fricke – background vocals
 Dr. Lee Hargrove-Stein – synthesizer
 John Hughey – steel guitar
 Leo Jane Singers – background vocals
 Shane Keister – synthesizer
 Sheldon Kurland – strings
 Michael Leech – bass guitar
 Larrie Londin – drums
 Kenneth Malone – drums
 Charlie McCoy – harmonica, vibraphone
 Terry McMillan – harmonica, vibraphone
 Tony Migliore – synthesizer
 Robert Ogdin – piano
 Dale Sellers – guitar
 Chip Young – guitar

Technical
 Rex Collier – engineering
 Tom Collins – production
 Steve Goostree – mastering
 Danny Hilley – engineering
 Archie Jordan – string arrangement
 Les Ladd – engineering, mixing
 Denny Purcell – mastering
 Skip Shimmin – mastering

Charts

Weekly charts

Year-end charts

Singles

References

1978 albums
Barbara Mandrell albums
ABC Records albums
Albums produced by Tom Collins (record producer)